Kagran may refer to:

 , a district of Vienna, Austria
 Kagran (Vienna U-Bahn), a station on line U1